Sve što sanjam is a concept album by the Bosnian pop band Crvena Jabuka, released in spring 2000. The album was recorded in the Rockoko Studio in Zagreb where many of the band's albums have been, and still are, recorded. In many places this album is sold with white and blue, but some may have it in pink and blue. The songs on this album are a little longer and sound more country and western than most of the band's music.

Track listing
  3:35
  4:50
  4:20
  3:25
  4:45
  5:05
  5:10
  4:00
  4:20
  4:40
  4:00
  4:30
  4:15
  5:00

Personnel

Crvena Jabuka
Darko Jelcic – drums, percussion
Danijel Lastric  – keyboards, vocals
Kresmir Kastelan –  bass guitar
Drazen Zeric  – vocals
Niksa Bratos –  violin, mandolin, clarinet, keyboards, synthesizer, programming, guitar, vocals
Zlatko Bebek –  guitar

Other personnel
Darija Hodnik – backing vocals
Jana Nemacek – background vocals
Mirza Treterac – background vocals
Emir Pagric – background vocals
Klapa Nastalgija – vocals (9)

Production
Produced by – Niksa Bratos – producer, programming
Danijel Lastric – programming

2000 albums
Crvena jabuka albums